H.R. Basavaraj (21 January 1921 – 6 April 1999) was an Indian politician and member of Rajya Sabha (the upper house of the Parliament of India) from 1978 to 1980.

Personal life 
Basavaraj was born on 21 January 1921 in Hirehal village of Anantapur district. Hirehal Ramaiah was his father. He was SSLC educated.

Position held

Death 
Basavaraj died on 6th April 1999 at the age of 78.

References 

1921 births
1999 deaths
Indian politicians